The Elmer School District was a community public school district that served students in kindergarten through fourth grade from the Borough of Elmer in Salem County, New Jersey, United States. The district also operated The Learning Center in Elmer School for infants through PreK-4. At a meeting conducted in June 2009, the Elmer Board of Education voted to merge with the Pittsgrove Township School District and would send all of its students as part of the send-receive relationship.

For fifth through twelfth grades, public school students attended Pittsgrove Township Middle School (5-8) and then Arthur P. Schalick High School (9-12), in Pittsgrove Township, as part of a sending/receiving relationship with the Pittsgrove Township School District.

As of the 2007–08 school year, the district's one school had an enrollment of 76 students and 6.0 classroom teachers (on an FTE basis), for a student–teacher ratio of 12.7.

The district was classified by the New Jersey Department of Education as being in District Factor Group "CD", the sixth-highest of eight groupings. District Factor Groups organize districts statewide to allow comparison by common socioeconomic characteristics of the local districts. From lowest socioeconomic status to highest, the categories are A, B, CD, DE, FG, GH, I and J. Elmer School District is now merged with Pittsgrove Township School District.

School
Elmer School had 76 students as of the 2007–08 school year.

Administration
Core members of the district's administration are:
Dr. Stephen E. Berkowitz, Superintendent / Principal
Henry Bermann, Board Secretary / School Business Administrator

References

External links
Elmer School website

School Data for the Elmer School, National Center for Education Statistics

Elmer, New Jersey
New Jersey District Factor Group CD
School districts in Salem County, New Jersey